Donald Eugene Gilmore (1928-2003) was a member of the Ohio House of Representatives. He also served as the Franklin County Deputy Sheriff and with the Dublin, Ohio police department.  He also owned a security company, and was a former pitcher for the St. Louis Cardinals.  Gilmore was a Freemason.

References

Republican Party members of the Ohio House of Representatives
2003 deaths
People from Dublin, Ohio
1928 births
20th-century American politicians